The  was a government office under Japan's Tokugawa shogunate, concerned with the armament of the shōguns soldiers.

The office was established in 1604; however, this office was known as bugu-bugyō after 1863.

List of Gusoku bugyō

See also
 Bugyō

Notes

References
 Nussbaum, Louis-Frédéric and Käthe Roth. (2005).  Japan encyclopedia. Cambridge: Harvard University Press. ;  OCLC 58053128

Government of feudal Japan
Officials of the Tokugawa shogunate